Parbattia excavata is a moth in the family Crambidae. It was described by Zhang, Li and Wang in 2003. It is found in China (Hubei).

References

Moths described in 2003
Pyraustinae